The George Rogers Clark Memorial Bridge, known locally as the Second Street Bridge, is a four-lane cantilevered truss bridge crossing the Ohio River between Louisville, Kentucky and Jeffersonville, Indiana, that carries US 31.

History
Debate to build a highway bridge connecting Louisville to Jeffersonville began in 1919. Both cities and the public were in favor of building the bridge, but how to fund the project was unclear. In 1926 a ballot measure was voted down by residents which would have allowed the government to fund the bridge construction. A similar measure to fund the bridge construction with municipal insured bonds was voted down shortly after. Officials finally agreed to authorize a private company to construct the bridge using private funds, and they were granted authority to toll the bridge to recoup their investment.

The bridge was designed by Ralph Modjeski and Frank Masters with architectural details handled by Paul Philippe Cret of Philadelphia. Construction of the approaches and administration buildings began in 1926, and construction of the bridge itself began in June 1928 by the American Bridge Company of Pittsburgh at a cost of $4.7 million. The bridge was constructed using a newly invented method. Rather than build out from the shore, the bridge was constructed from the center towards land. The new method proved successful, and was subsequently used in the construction of many other bridges including the Oakland Bay Bridge in San Francisco a few years later. Newspapers reported two deaths during the construction of the bridge. The first worker died in 1929 after being struck by an iron crank, and a second worker died falling from the bridge and landing on a barge.

President Herbert Hoover dedicated the bridge at its opening. It was opened to the public on October 31, 1929 as the Louisville Municipal Bridge and operated as a toll bridge.  The toll was 35 cents until December 31, 1936, when it was lowered to 25 cents. The last of the bonds that financed the construction were redeemed in 1946, and the tolls were removed.

On January 17, 1949, the bridge was renamed in honor of George Rogers Clark, recognized as the founder of Louisville and neighboring Clark County, Indiana. The bridge was rehabilitated in 1958. There was a movement in the 1950s to restore tolls, as traffic on the bridge had reached capacity and funding was needed for an additional bridge, but a toll was opposed strongly by most residents. Ultimately most of the funds for two additional bridges (for motor vehicles only) that carry interstate highways came from the federal government.

Muhammad Ali threw his gold medal from the 1960 Rome Olympics into the Ohio River while standing on the bridge. The bridge was placed on the National Register of Historic Places on March 8, 1984, as the Louisville Municipal Bridge, Pylons and Administration Building.

In June 2010, Kentucky Governor Steve Beshear and Louisville Mayor Jerry Abramson announced a new $3 million streetscape improvement project directly underneath the Clark Memorial Bridge, a three-block area from Main Street to River Road, which transformed the area into a plaza. It included a new decorative lighting system under the refurbished Clark Memorial Bridge, wide sidewalks, seats, new pedestrian and festival areas, and extensive plantings, making it an inviting promenade for the recently constructed and neighboring KFC Yum! Center. The project was completed in time for the October 2010 opening of the arena.  CARMAN provided the landscape architecture and civil engineering services for the 2010 streetscape project.

The bridge was expected to see significant increases in traffic following the completion of the Ohio River Bridges Project near the end of 2016. The project included repurposing the John F. Kennedy Memorial Bridge, which previously carried I-65 in both directions, for southbound traffic only; building the new Abraham Lincoln Bridge for northbound I-65 traffic; and building the Lewis and Clark Bridge to connect I-265 in the two states. The two I-65 crossings and the I-265 bridge are now tolled to pay for the project. One consultant who worked on a transportation study for the Kentucky government predicted that traffic on the bridge would increase by 25% once tolling on the other bridges started, and the mayor of Jeffersonville expressed concern about the possible effects of increased traffic on the bridge's structural integrity. These concerns were heightened by the discovery of a cracked girder and other structural issues (since repaired) during a routine 2014 inspection.

Culture
Locally, the Clark Bridge is known as the Second Street Bridge due to its direct alignment onto Second Street in Louisville. There is a pedestrian sidewalk on each side of the bridge deck. The Clark Bridge was previously the only regional Ohio River bridge open to non-motorized traffic, until the opening of the Indiana side of the nearby Big Four Bridge to pedestrian and bicycle traffic in May 2014.

Since 1991, the bridge has been used as "ground zero" for the annual Thunder Over Louisville event, when a waterfall of fireworks flows along the entire length of the bridge during the fireworks show. This involves traffic being closed for much of the week. This is criticized as it cuts off both the only non-interstate and, prior to the Big Four Bridge reopening, the only pedestrian route between Louisville and southern Indiana, which can impact local businesses such as bicycle couriers.

The bridge is featured in a scene from the 1981 movie Stripes in which Bill Murray drives his cab to the middle of the span, gets out of the vehicle and then tosses his keys into the river below.

See also

 List of crossings of the Ohio River

References

External links

Clark Memorial Bridge at Bridges & Tunnels
Municipal Bridge Building and Pylons at Louisville Art Deco

Bridges completed in 1929
Clark
Bridges over the Ohio River
Road bridges on the National Register of Historic Places in Indiana
Road bridges on the National Register of Historic Places in Kentucky
National Register of Historic Places in Clark County, Indiana
National Register of Historic Places in Louisville, Kentucky
Paul Philippe Cret buildings
Bridges in Clark County, Indiana
U.S. Route 31
Bridges of the United States Numbered Highway System
Former toll bridges in Indiana
Former toll bridges in Kentucky
Cantilever bridges in the United States
Warren truss bridges in the United States
Jeffersonville, Indiana
1929 establishments in Indiana
1929 establishments in Kentucky